The 2019 Rome ePrix (formally the 2019 GEOX Rome E-Prix) was a Formula E electric car race held at the Circuto Cittadino dell'EUR in the EUR residential and business district of the Italian capital of Rome on 13 April 2019. It was the seventh round of the 2018–19 Formula E season and the second running of the event. The 29-lap race was won by Jaguar driver Mitch Evans from a second position start. Andre Lotterer finished second for Techeetah and HWA Racelab driver Stoffel Vandoorne came third.

Andre Lotterer of DS Techeetah won the pole position by recording the fastest lap in qualifying and maintained his start line advantage heading into the first corner. He kept the lead until he was overtaken by Evans on the 18th lap. That allowed Evans into the lead. Despite being challenged by Lotterer, Evans takes his first victory of his career and for the Jaguar team.

Report

Background
Coming into the race from Sanya three weeks earlier, BMW Andretti driver António Félix da Costa was in the lead of the Drivers' Championship with 62 points and was only 1 point ahead of Jérôme d'Ambrosio of Mahindra in second. DS Techeetah's Jean-Éric Vergne was a further seven points behind in third and Sam Bird of Virgin Racing placed fourth on tie with Vergne. Audi Sport Abt Schaeffler driver Lucas Di Grassi rounded out the top five with 52 points scored. In the Teams' Championship, Virgin Racing were leading with 97 points; tie on points with Mahindra behind in second position. Audi in third with a point behind, and DS Techeetah were 2 points behind in forth. BMW Andretti completing the top five with 80 points.

Qualifying

During qualifying, Andre Lotterer took his first pole position of the season with Mitch Evens placed at second place and Lopez finishing in third place

Race

At the start, Lopez caused a huge pileup at the back causing the race to be stopped. The race was restarted behind the safety car, but drivers struggled to maintain control of their cars. At the last lap, Mitch Evans won the race with Andre Lotterer finishing second

Classification

Qualifying

Notes
  — Pascal Wehrlein received five-place grid penalty for overspeeding under red flag.
  — Alex Lynn's best lap times were deleted for exceeding 250 kW (340 hp) of power
  — Alexander Sims received 60-place grid penalty converted into a 10-second stop and go penalty during the race for changing E-motor, gearbox and inverter

Race 

Notes
  — António Félix da Costa received 5-second time penalty for an undercharged battery.
  — Jean Eric Vergne received a drive through penalty converted into a 37-second time penalty for overtaking under Full Course Yellow.
  — Maximilian Günther received a 5-second time penalty for overspeeding under Full Course Yellow and a drive through penalty converted into a 37-second time penalty for attack mode infringement.
  — Pole position.
  — Fastest lap.

Standings after the race 

Drivers' Championship standings

Teams' Championship standings

References

|- style="text-align:center"
|width="35%"|Previous race:2019 Sanya ePrix
|width="30%"|FIA Formula E Championship2018–19 season
|width="35%"|Next race:2019 Paris ePrix
|- style="text-align:center"
|width="35%"|Previous race:2018 Rome ePrix
|width="30%"|Rome ePrix
|width="35%"|Next race:2021 Rome ePrix
|- style="text-align:center"

Rome ePrix
Rome ePrix
Rome ePrix
Rome ePrix